The first season of the television drama series The Secret Life of Us aired from 16 July to 26 November 2001 on Network Ten in Australia. The series traces the often tumultuous life of a group of friends in their mid-twenties who live in a St Kilda apartment building.

Production 
After airing the telemovie and subsequently receiving a great reception, Ten took a multimillion-dollar gamble and commissioned The Secret Life of Us to series. Another gamble the network took was airing the series at 9:30pm, due partly to stop the breaching of censorship laws. Of the timeslot, Herald Sun journalist, Robert Fidgeon wrote, "Not that The Secret Life of Us is a tits-and-bums, obscenity-filled raunchfest. It is a quality series about the relationships of a group of twentysomethings. As such, it deserves to succeed. It is far and away the most accurate, honest and intelligent Australian drama series ever pitched at younger viewers."

Plot 
The series traces the often tumultuous life of a group of friends in their mid-twenties who live in a St Kilda apartment building and are all looking for the same thing – love, sex, romance and success. The problem is they haven't worked out how to get it yet – so they make it up as they go along. Exploring sympathetic themes and establishing a recognised trifecta of homelife, lovelife and worklife, their experiences become a salient reminder that despite the struggle, juggle and balance of these things – friendship is what matters. Alex Christensen is an ambitious doctor who is riddled with insecurities and shares a flat with would-be-writer Evan Wylde who is in need of motivation and Kelly Lewis, a vivacious real estate agent who quits her job because of the affair she was having with her boss. Miranda Lang has her sighs set on stardom and together with her actor boyfriend Richie Blake, they share a flat with the no-nonsense Will McGill. Simon Trader works as a bartender at the local pub and is a source of wisdom and love. Jason Kennedy and Gabrielle Kovitch are about to get married for the wrong reasons – who will be the first to realise their mistake?

Cast

Main 
 Claudia Karvan as Alex Christensen
 Deborah Mailman as Kelly Lewis
 Samuel Johnson as Evan Wylde
 Abi Tucker as Miranda Lang
 Joel Edgerton as Will McGill
 Spencer McLaren as Richie Blake
 Sibylla Budd as Gabrielle Kovitch
 Damian De Montemas as Jason Kennedy
 David Tredinnick as Simon Trader

Recurring 
 Jessica Gower as Sam (5 episodes)
 Benjamin McNair as Joseph (4 episodes)
 Catherine McClements as Carmen (3 episodes)
 Tasma Walton as Leah (3 episodes)
 Oscar Redding as Eric (2 episodes)

Guest 
 Andrew McKaige as Sean (2 episodes)
 Tempany Deckert as Andrena (2 episodes)
 Leverne McDonnell as Kelly's Boss (1 episode)
 Sandy Winton as Vincent (1 episode)

Episodes

{| class="wikitable plainrowheaders" style="margin: auto; width: 100%"
|-
!! style="background-color:#FF5F6C; color: black; text-align: center;" width=6%|No. inseries
!! style="background-color:#FF5F6C; color: black; text-align: center;" width=6%|No. inseason
!! style="background-color:#FF5F6C; color: black; text-align: center;" width=26%|Title
!! style="background-color:#FF5F6C; color: black; text-align: center;" width=17%|Directed by
!! style="background-color:#FF5F6C; color: black; text-align: center;" width=29%|Written by
!! style="background-color:#FF5F6C; color: black; text-align: center;" width=15%|Original air date
|-

|}

DVD release

References

External links
 

2001 Australian television seasons